is a 1999 Japanese horror film directed by Shinji Aoyama, starring Reiko Takashima.

Plot

Cast
 Reiko Takashima as Miyako Murakami
 Yutaka Matsushige as Detective Hiraoka
 Seijun Suzuki as Kurume
 Toshio Shiba as Dr. Fuji
 Kojiro Hongo as Jion
 Hitomi Miwa as Rika Shinohara
 Masatoshi Matsuo as Yoshiki Shingo

Reception
Todd Brown of Twitch Film commented that Shinji Aoyama is creating a subtle parody of the Japanese horror film industry. Stina Chyn of Film Threat noted that EM Embalming is one of the few Japanese horror films that contains actual non-creepy segments. Andy McKeague of Monsters and Critics felt that the film is genuinely unsettling and morbidly fascinating at the same time.

Mike Bracken of IGN criticized the film, saying that EM Embalming's greatest failure is that it often tries to be too many things at once and the film itself is almost as schizophrenic as its antagonist. However, he felt that several sequences of the embalming process are gruesome and extended conversations between Miyako and the black market organ harvester are eerily intriguing.

Meanwhile, Mark Schilling of The Japan Times said: "While verging on a black comic turn, Toshio Shiba's performance as Dr. Fuji is the film's strongest; his dark night of the soul is not just another fashionably blank attitude, but the genuine article, forged in the satanic mills of anger, loathing and despair."

References

External links
 
 

Films directed by Shinji Aoyama
1990s psychological horror films
Japanese horror films
1999 horror films
1999 films
1990s Japanese films